Pantoporia sandaka, the extra lascar, is a species of nymphalid butterfly found in tropical and subtropical Asia.

Subspecies
The subspecies of Pantoporia sandaka are-
 Pantoporia sandaka sandaka Eliot, 1969 – (Peninsular Malaya, Sumatra, Bangka, Pulo Laut, Borneo)
 Pantoporia sandaka davidsoni Eliot, 1969 – (India - Thailand - Hainan, Burma)
 Pantoporia sandaka ferrari Eliot, 1969 – (Andaman Is.)
 Pantoporia sandaka michaeli Tsukada & Kaneko, 1985

Food plants
The larvae feed on Acacia caesia and Dalbergia horrida.

References

Pantoporia
Butterflies of Asia
Fauna of Pakistan
Butterflies of Indochina
Butterflies described in 1892